Crazy Gary's Mobile Disco is a play by Gary Owen that was first presented by Paines Plough and Sgript Cymru in 2001.  The play is set on a Saturday night in a small town in Wales and focuses on three lads in their mid-twenties stuck with their school reputations of the gimp, the geek and the bully. The play takes the format of three monologues and the tagline for the play is 'Their dream is to get the hell out..'

Dramatis personae

Gary: a hate-fuelled arsehole who dobs enemies into Crimewatch for fun.  
Matthew D Melody: charismatically naïve and thinks Frank Sinatra can save the world.
Russell Markham:  imploding from a life full of repressed anger, which is causing everything from impotence to fear of cancer.

References

External links
  reviews curtesy of 'Theatre in Wales'

2001 plays
Welsh plays